The .32 Winchester Self-Loading (also called .32SL, .32SLR, or .32WSL) is an American rifle cartridge.

Description
Winchester introduced the .32SL and .35SL cartridges in the Winchester Model 1905 self-loading rifle, a centerfire version of the Winchester Model 1903. The .32SL never gained popularity as a hunting cartridge, although it may be suitable for the largest small game such as fox and coyote at ranges under 150 yards. Both the .32SL and .35SL were soon superseded by the introduction of the more powerful .351SL in the Winchester Model 1907.

When first introduced, however, the notable firearm expert Townsend Whelen noted the .32SL cartridge as displaying similar ballistics as the .32-40 Winchester black powder, low-pressure cartridge. He further suggests the best use of the .32 SL as being for rapid-fire target shooting for ranges up to 300 yards. Within such ranges, it is quite an accurate cartridge.

In October 1940, an Army Ordnance circular suggested development of a light rifle using a .30 caliber cartridge similar to the "Winchester Self-loading Cartridge, Caliber .32" to replace the pistol and submachine gun. This led to the production of the "Caliber .30 SL, M1" cartridge directly based on the .32 SL in February 1941 and, after a design competition, adoption of the Winchester-designed M1 carbine in October 1941.

Dimensions

See also
8 mm caliber
List of cartridges by caliber
List of rifle cartridges
Table of handgun and rifle cartridges

References

External links

 .32 W.S.L. 
 .32 Winchester Self Loading
 Winchester Self-Loading Rifles
 7.65x33R: Kynoch; .32 Winchester Self-Loading

Pistol and rifle cartridges
Winchester Repeating Arms Company cartridges